The Naval Protection Force (German: Marineschutzkräfte — MSK) was a marine unit of the German Navy. It had the size of a Battalion and was part of the 1st Flotilla (Einsatzflottille 1). It was established on April 1, 2005, but traces its roots back to 1958, when the so-called Sea battalion (Seebataillon) was activated. Its headquarters was in Eckernförde on the Baltic Sea. Next to the Naval Special Deployment Force (Spezialisierte Einsatzkräfte Marine, SEKM), the Naval Protection Force were considered to be a marine element within the German Navy.

The Naval Protection Force battalion was organized into five units: one staff and support company, three naval protection companies and one military intelligence platoon.

On 1 April 2014 the Naval Protection Force became an integral part of the re-formed Seebataillon (Naval Force Protection Battalion).

Structure 

The Naval Protection Force (Marineschutzkräfte) consisted out of around 500 soldiers and structured into a staff company, three combat companies plus a HUMINT platoon. Every company, led by a lieutenant (Kapitänleutnant, OF-2).

 Marineschutzkräfte (HQ)
 Staff and Support Company (S1, S2, S3, S4, S6)
 1st Company 
 1st platoon
 2nd platoon
 3rd platoon
 4th platoon
 2nd Company
 1st platoon
 2nd platoon
 3rd platoon
 4th platoon
 3rd Company
 1st platoon
 2nd platoon
 3rd platoon
 4th platoon
 HUMINT platoon

Deployments 
Despite their short time of existence (8 years), the German Naval Protection Forces participated in a range of national and international Deployments.

International Deployments 

 Afghanistan: 8th contingent of ISAF (one Infantry unit)
 Bosnia and Herzegovina: Deployment within EUFOR
 Djibouti: Deployment within Operation Enduring Freedom
 Horn of Africa: Deployment within Operation Atalanta
 Kosovo: Deployment within KFOR
 Lebanon: Mobile Protection Elements (MPE) for the protection of UNIFIL vessels
 Cyprus: Harbour Protection Element (HPE) in Limassol to secure the German operated UNIFIL base

National Deployments 

 Protection of  US-American facilities as part of the Host Nation Support in 2003
 Protection of US-American ships during the Kiel Week
 Protection of the Ammunition Supply Ship Westerwald during the mission- and training passage to South Africa  and back

Equipment

Personal Weapons 

Heckler & Koch G36, an Assault rifle
Heckler & Koch MG4, a Light machine gun
Rheinmetall MG3, a General-purpose machine gun
M3M, a Heavy machine gun
Heckler & Koch MP7, a Submachine gun
MP2, a Submachine gun
Heckler & Koch MP5, a Submachine gun
P8, a Pistol
G22, a Sniper rifle
G82, a Sniper rifle
Heckler & Koch G3, a Battle rifle
G28, a Designated marksman rifle

Anti-Tank- / Anti-Structure Weapons 

Panzerfaust 3, an Anti-tank  Rocket launcher
Raytheon Fliegerfaust 2, a Man-portable air-defense systems
MILAN, an Anti-tank missile

Vehicles

See also 
 German commando frogmen

References

External links 

Official information on marine de:
 Naval Protection Force (German)

Other information:
 www.marine-portraits.de: Portrait of Naval Protection Force (MSK) (German)

Military units and formations established in 2005
Military units and formations disestablished in 2014
Military units and formations of the German Navy
Special forces of Germany
Germany